Mažuranić is a Croatian surname. The surname may refer to:

 Antun Mažuranić (1805-1888), Croatian writer and linguist
 Ivan Mažuranić (1814-1890), Croatian poet, linguist and politician
 Ivana Brlić-Mažuranić (1874-1938), Croatian writer for children
 Matija Mažuranić (1817-1881), Croatian writer
 Vladimir Mažuranić (1845-1928), Croatian lawyer and politician
 Vladimir Fran Mažuranić (1859-1928), Croatian writer
 Vlado Mažuranić (1915-1985), Yugoslav fencer

Croatian surnames